Niha is a town in the Chouf which belongs to Mount Lebanon of Lebanon.
The town is 44 miles from Beirut and it has about 3,750 hectares; there are 6,500 inhabitants of Druze and Christian. However, there are only two public schools in the city. It is famous because of its olive groves and its grapes, apples, plums and almonds production. Its tourist attractions are The church of Saint Joseph, El Qa'ah Spring, The prophet Job tomb and Niha's Castle. Like all Lebanon's corners, Niha owns a cultural or historical richness that dwells in the heritage of the country. Lebanese singer Wadih El Safi was born in Niha. The population speaks Lebanese Arabic.

Etymology 
The name Niha is used by four Lebanese cities: Niha, Zahlé; Niha, Batroun; Niha, Tyre and Niha, Chouf.
The word neeha is Syriac and denotes to the place the character of calm, peaceful.

History 
 
It is believed that Niha is the place where biblical prophet Job lived temporarily during the period before and through his healing miracle. Thus there is a relatively modern structure located in a hill overlooking Niha town in the Chouf that is supposed to be the burial site of the prophet Job and the site in which he performed his renowned miracle. The domed shrine of Job with arched courtyards and terraces constitutes most of the site, surrounded by a small cave and mountainous landscapes and green woods.

Moreover, Niha is one of the most known destinations in the area, with many caves, both natural and man-made. One among them, a cave-fortress that was cut into a cliff during the Crusades between 1165 and 1260, is named Niha's Castle or Shakif Tiron. According to the popular tale prince Fakhreddine El Ma'ani II hid there when hiding from the Ottomans in 1635. However, the accurate historic version links these events to prince's father Korkomaz during 1584.

In 1776, Ali al-Zahir,  a nephew of  Zahir al-Umar, was expelled from his strong-hold of Deir Hanna by Cezayirli Gazi Hasan Pasha. After this, Ali al-Zahir took refuge in Niha. In 1838, Eli Smith noted  Niha  as a village, part of Esh-Shuf el-Haity, located in Aklim esh-Shuf, north of Jezzin.

Tourist attractions 
 Druze Prophet Job shrine مقام النبي أيوب
 Niha's Castle قلعة نيحا
 Saint George church كنيسة مار جرجس
 Saint Joseph church كنيسة مار يوسف
 Mysterious sarcophagus نواويس
 El Qa'ah Spring عين القاعة

See also
 Druze in Lebanon
 Christianity in Lebanon

References

Bibliography

 Debenham, Frank (1972). "El Atlas de nuestro tiempo", The Reader's Digest Association Limited, London, 241

External links 
 Page of Niha in Localiban (in English, French and Arabic)
 About Niha (in English)
 Some cities in the Chouf including Niha (in English)

Populated places in Chouf District
Druze communities in Lebanon
Maronite Christian communities in Lebanon